Xanthophyllum clovis is a tree in the family Polygalaceae. The specific epithet  is from the French meaning "nail" or "clove", referring to the clove-like appearance of the buds.

Description
The bark is greyish. The flowers are dark red when dry.

Distribution and habitat
Xanthophyllum clovis is endemic to Borneo. Its habitat is lowland mixed dipterocarp or swamp forests.

References

clovis
Endemic flora of Borneo
Trees of Borneo
Plants described in 1973